Krasnaya Dubrava is a rural locality (a settlement) in Rogozikhinsky Selsoviet, Pavlovsky District, Altai Krai, Russia. The population was 257 as of 2013. There are six streets.

Geography 
Krasnaya Dubrava is located 12 km southwest of Pavlovsk (the district's administrative centre) by road. Rogozikha is the nearest rural locality.

References 

Rural localities in Pavlovsky District, Altai Krai